The Colorado Mammoth are a lacrosse team based in Denver, Colorado playing in the National Lacrosse League (NLL). The 2009 season was the 23rd in franchise history and 7th as the Mammoth (previously the Washington Power, Pittsburgh Crossefire, and Baltimore Thunder).

Regular season

Conference standings

Game log
Reference:

Playoffs

Game log
Reference:

Player stats
Reference:

Runners (Top 10)

Note: GP = Games played; G = Goals; A = Assists; Pts = Points; LB = Loose balls; PIM = Penalty minutes

Goaltenders
Note: GP = Games played; MIN = Minutes; W = Wins; L = Losses; GA = Goals against; Sv% = Save percentage; GAA = Goals against average

Transactions

New players
 John Gallant - acquired in trade
 Andrew Leyshon - signed as free agent
 Andrew Potter - acquired in trade
 Jay Preece - signed as free agent
 Gary Rosyski - signed as free agent

Players not returning
 Jason Bloom - traded
 Jordan Cornfield - released
 Josh Sims - retired
 Dave Stilley - traded

Trades

Entry draft
The 2008 NLL Entry Draft took place on September 7, 2008. The Mammoth selected the following players:

Roster

See also
2009 NLL season

References

Colorado
Colorado Mammoth